Marka is a former rocket launch site situated in Lindesnes, Norway. It was used for twelve launches of sounding rockets of the type Super Loki between November 1983 and January 1984.

References

Rocket launch sites in Norway
Lindesnes